Floyd Cramer (October 27, 1933 – December 31, 1997) was an American pianist who became famous for his use of melodic "half step" attacks. He was inducted into both the Country Music Hall of Fame and the Rock and Roll Hall of Fame. His signature playing style was a cornerstone of the pop-oriented "Nashville sound" of the 1950s and 1960s. Cramer's "slip-note" or "bent-note" style, in which a passing note slides almost instantly into or away from a chordal note, influenced a generation of pianists. His  sound became popular to the degree that he stepped out of his role as a sideman and began touring as a solo act. In 1960, his piano instrumental solo, "Last Date" went to number two on the Billboard Hot 100 pop music chart and sold over one million copies. Its follow-up, "On the Rebound", topped the UK Singles Chart in 1961. As a studio musician, he became one of a cadre of elite players dubbed the Nashville A-Team and he  performed on scores of hit records.

Biography
Cramer was born in Shreveport, Louisiana, and grew up in the small town of Huttig, Arkansas. He taught himself to play the piano. After finishing high school, he returned to Shreveport, where he worked as a pianist for the radio show Louisiana Hayride.

After Elvis Presley performed on Louisiana Hayride in 1955, he hired his own band which included Cramer, Jimmy Day, Scotty Moore, Bill Black, and D.J. Fontana. This group remained his supporting band for much of that year; however, when Presley asked them to relocate to Hollywood, Cramer and Day declined to follow him there, preferring to remain in Nashville to pursue independent careers as studio musicians. In Nashville, Cramer found that piano accompaniment in country music was growing in popularity. By the next year he was, in his words, "in day and night doing session". Before long, he was one of the busiest studio musicians in the industry, playing piano for stars such as Elvis Presley, Brenda Lee, Patsy Cline, the Browns, Jim Reeves, Eddy Arnold, Roy Orbison, Don Gibson, and the Everly Brothers, among others. It was Cramer's piano playing, for instance, on Presley's first RCA Victor single, "Heartbreak Hotel". While Cramer was well-established as a  session player, he had a long career as a solo performer with dozens of his own albums and singles, including some Top 40 instrumental hits.

Cramer had released records under his own name since the early 1950s and became well known following the release of "Last Date", a 45-rpm single, released by RCA Victor in 1960. The instrumental piece exhibited a relatively new concept in piano playing known as the "slip note" style. The record went to number two on the Billboard Hot 100 pop music chart, sold over one million copies, and was awarded a gold disc. The song was kept out of the number 1 position by Elvis Presley's "Are You Lonesome Tonight". The session pianist for Elvis's recording of that #1 song, in a very early morning session (about 4:00 AM) at RCA Studio B in Nashville, was none other than Floyd Cramer himself.

In 1961, Cramer had a hit with "On the Rebound", which went to number 4, and number 1 on the UK Singles Chart. ("On the Rebound" was featured during the opening credits of the 2009 Oscar-nominated film An Education, which was set in England in 1961.) Also in 1961, Cramer had a hit with "San Antonio Rose" (number 8).

By the mid-1960s, Cramer had become a respected performer, making numerous albums and touring with guitar maestro Chet Atkins and saxophonist Boots Randolph, sometimes headlining and sometimes as the opening act for Eddy Arnold. Cramer also performed with them as a member of the Million Dollar Band.

Cramer died of lung cancer on New Year's Eve, 1997 at the age of 64. He was interred in the Spring Hill Cemetery in the Nashville suburb of Madison, Tennessee.

Legacy
Cramer’s grandson, Jason Coleman, followed in his footsteps taking up the piano, performing with him on television and in concert at a young age. At age 17, he played "Please Help Me, I'm Falling", the first song to feature Cramer's signature slip notes, with Hank Locklin at the Grand Ole Opry, and two years later played piano for the Medallion Ceremony at Cramer's induction into the Country Music Hall of Fame. He carries on his grandfather's legacy with recordings and a touring tribute concert, The Piano Magic of Floyd Cramer, sharing the piano arrangements and story of Cramer's contributions to American music.

Awards
In 2003, Cramer was inducted into the Country Music Hall of Fame and the Rock and Roll Hall of Fame. In 2004, his recording of "Last Date" was inducted into the Grammy Hall of Fame, established to honor recordings of lasting qualitative or historical significance. In 2008 Cramer was inducted into the Louisiana Music Hall of Fame.

East Tennessee State University, in Johnson City, Tennessee, offers the Floyd Cramer Competitive Scholarship.

Discography

Albums

Singles

A"Dallas", a cover version of the theme to the popular TV series, peaked at No. 8 on the RPM Country Tracks chart in Canada.

See also
The Nashville A-Team

References

Other sources
Escott, Colin (1998), "Floyd Cramer". In Paul Kingsbury (ed.), The Encyclopedia of Country Music, New York: Oxford University Press., pp. 117–18.

External links
 Rockhall.com
 Spaceagepop.com
 
 Country Music Hall of Fame and Museum
 
 Floyd Cramer recordings at the Discography of American Historical Recordings.
 Jason Coleman, grandson of Floyd Cramer

1933 births
1997 deaths
American country pianists
American male pianists
American country singer-songwriters
Abbott Records artists
RCA Victor artists
Musicians from Shreveport, Louisiana
People from Union County, Arkansas
Deaths from lung cancer
Country Music Hall of Fame inductees
Members of the Country Music Association
Deaths from cancer in Arkansas
Million Dollar Band (country music group) members
Burials in Tennessee
20th-century American singers
20th-century American pianists
Singer-songwriters from Louisiana
Singer-songwriters from Arkansas
Country musicians from Louisiana
Country musicians from Arkansas
Easy listening musicians
20th-century American male musicians
American male singer-songwriters